"Tentacles of Doom" is the third episode of the second series of Channel 4 sitcom Father Ted and the ninth episode overall.

Synopsis
While Ted is trying to fix the plumbing in the Craggy Island parochial house, he receives news that the nearby Holy Stone of Clonrichert is being upgraded to a "class two relic" by the Vatican. Three bishops are being sent to perform the ceremony and will be staying in the parochial house, and Ted realises he needs to have both Dougal and Jack on their "best behaviour". Ted tells Dougal to keep to matters about the Church, while he trains Jack, with the promise of a drink, to speak simple replies to answer any question he may be asked, specifically "yes", and "that would be an ecumenical matter".

Bishops O'Neill, Facks, and Jordan arrive, and with Ted, Dougal, and Jack, they perform the ceremony without incident, and then they congregate into pairs. Dougal speaks with O'Neill, expressing his doubts about organised religion and the Catholic Church. Facks is enthusiastically impressed with Jack's "views" on the Church, and starts jabbing Jack with his finger to express his excitement, leading Jack to stuff the Holy Stone up Facks' rear end. At the parochial house, Ted excuses himself from Jordan to use the toilet, but as the plumbing is not yet fixed, Ted's flushes causes the water to erupt out over a drain in the yard that Jordan happens to be standing over. The elderly bishop has a heart attack and dies.

Later, Ted and Dougal watch the three bishops leave: O'Neill has taken to Dougal's words and has left the Church to become a hippie (asking that Dougal now call him "Eddie"), Facks is escorted in an ambulance to have the Holy Stone removed, and a hearse drives away with Jordan's casket. When all have gone, Ted reflects on the visit, remarking that it went rather well.

External links
"Tentacles Of Doom" at the IMDB

Father Ted episodes
1996 British television episodes